Hospitals in Mongolia include:
 Intermed Hospital

References

 
Hospitals
Mongolia, List of hospitals in
Mongolia